Ronald Bullough  (6 April 1931 – 20 November 2020) was a British materials scientist. He made leading contributions in the field of irradiated solids. He was a former Chief Scientist and Director of Corporate Research at the UK Atomic Energy Authority.

References 

British materials scientists
British nuclear physicists
1931 births 
2020 deaths 
Fellows of the Institute of Physics
Members of the United States National Academy of Engineering
National Physical Laboratory (United Kingdom)
Fellows of the Royal Society